Ecobank Rwanda, whose full name is Ecobank Rwanda Limited, formerly Bank of Commerce, Development and Industry (BCDI), is a commercial bank in Rwanda, licensed and supervised by the National Bank of Rwanda, the central bank and national banking regulator.

Location
The headquarters of Ecobank Rwanda and the main branch of the bank are located along KN3 Avenue in the central business district of the city of Kigali, the capital and largest urban centre of Rwanda. The geographical coordinates of the banks headquarters are 01°56'49.0"S, 30°03'38.0"E (Latitude:-1.946944; Longitude:30.060556).

Overview
, the bank was a medium-sized financial institution with an asset base of RWF:193.527 billion (US$227.5 million), with shareholders' equity of RWF:17.835 billion (US$21 million), and RWF:161.625 billion (US$190 million) in customer deposits.

History
Ecobank Rwanda was established on 6 July 2007, when Ecobank International acquired the Bank of Commerce, Development and Industry (BCDI), a commercial bank in Rwanda that had failed. At the time of acquisition, BCDI had a 46 percent non-performing loan profile, was under-capitalized and suffered from poor governance and inadequate operational controls. The new owners had to invest US$11.6 in new capital, to meet capitalization requirements.

Shareholders
The bank is a 100 percent subsidiary of Ecobank Transnational Incorporated (ETI), the pan-African financial conglomerate headquartered in Lome, Togo, with operations in 36 countries, according to the Ecobank Group website.

Board of Governors
As of December 2016, the following were the members of the Board of Directors of Ecobank Rwanda:

 Vianney Shumbusho: Chairman
 Ephraim Turahirwa: Member 
 Ivan Twagirashema: Member 
 Ibironke Wilson: Member
 Rose Gakuba: Member 
 Alice Kilonzo-Zulu: Managing Director.

Management team
As recently as December 2017, the Managing Director and Chief Executive Officer of Ecobank Rwanda was Alice Kalonzo Zulu.

Branches
As of December 2016, Ecobank Rwanda maintained 16 networked branches across the country. In December 2017 going forward, the bank began closing some upcountry branches and transferring the services and some employees to agency banking, in combination with digital banking. Once the selected branches are closed, the bank will remain with eight brick-and-mortar branches only.

See also
 List of banks in Rwanda
 Economy of Rwanda

References

External links

 Company Profile of Ecobank Rwanda Limited

Banks of Rwanda
Economy of Kigali
Banks established in 2007
2007 establishments in Rwanda